Steve Davis (born in Bangor, County Down, Northern Ireland) is a professional percussionist and drummer. Davis has been active in such fields in the UK and Europe and is known as much for his jazz drumming as his free improvisational style of playing.

Education
Bangor Technical College with composer and bandleader Brian Irvine. 
Bretton Hall College of the University of Leeds where he studied with Dave Kane.

Career
Davis has played with European Jazz Orchestra and British Jazz legends including Django Bates, Evan Parker, Julian Siegel, Dylan Bates, Annie Whitehead, Ben Castle, Paul Dunmall and Jacqui Dankworth
 He has also performed with many European and American musicians including Dick Oats, Curtis Fuller and Marc Ribot
 He is the drummer in Bourne/Davis/Kane

Discography

Bourne/Davis/Kane
 Lost Something (August 2008) Edition Records EDN1003

Bourne/Davis/Kane with Paul Dunmall
 Moment To Moment

Human
 Being Human (2013) Babel. With Alexander Hawkins (piano), Dylan Bates (violin), Alex Bonney (trumpet)

Reviews of recorded work
  Review of "Lost Something", The Independent, 24 August 2008.
   Review of "Lost Something", The Guardian, 12 September 2008.

Drummers from Northern Ireland
Male drummers
Living people
Musicians from County Down
Year of birth missing (living people)
Alumni of the University of Leeds